Ioan Fiscuteanu (19 November 1937 – 8 December 2007) was a Romanian theater and film actor.

Fiscuteanu was born in Sânmihaiu de Câmpie, Bistrița-Năsăud County. He graduated from the I.L. Caragiale Institute of Theatre and Film Arts in Bucharest in 1962.

The role of Dante Remus Lăzărescu in the 2005 film The Death of Mr. Lăzărescu brought Fiscuteanu critical acclaim, as well as the Golden Swan award for best actor at the Copenhagen International Film Festival. He also played supporting roles in notable Romanian films such as Nae Caranfil's Asphalt Tango (1993), Șerban Marinescu's The Earth's Most Beloved Son (1993), and Lucian Pintilie's The Oak (1992).

In 2011 he was awarded the National Order of Faithful Service, Knight rank. He died in Târgu Mureș, aged 70, from colorectal cancer. He was buried in the city's Central Cemetery.

References

External links
 
 Fiscuteanu page on the Cinemagia site

1937 births
2007 deaths
People from Bistrița-Năsăud County
Romanian male film actors
Romanian male stage actors
20th-century Romanian male actors
Deaths from cancer in Romania
Deaths from colorectal cancer
Caragiale National University of Theatre and Film alumni
Recipients of the National Order of Faithful Service